Druid Hills Historic District may refer to:

 Druid Hills Historic District (Atlanta, Georgia), listed on the NRHP in Georgia
 Druid Hills Historic District (Hendersonville, North Carolina), listed on the NRHP in North Carolina

See also
Druid Hill Park Historic District, Baltimore, Maryland, NRHP-listed